Oleg Reabciuk (born 16 January 1998) is a Moldovan professional footballer who plays as a left-back for Super League Greece club Olympiacos and the Moldova national team.

Raised in Portugal, he played in the LigaPro for Porto B and the Primeira Liga for Paços de Ferreira. He moved in January 2021 to Olympiacos, where he won the Super League Greece in his first two seasons.

Reabciuk made his full international debut for Moldova in 2018, and has earned over 30 caps. He was named Moldovan Footballer of the Year on three consecutive occasions from 2020.

Club career

Early career / Porto
Born in Ialoveni, Moldova, Reabciuk migrated at the age of four to Rio Maior in the Santarém District of Portugal. At 11, he was spotted by Sporting CP while playing for a local team, but left a year later due to tiredness from the long journeys to Lisbon, and to concentrate on his education.

After becoming national champion with Rio Maior, Reabciuk was invited to train with C.F. Os Belenenses in June 2015, having impressed in a match against them. He then moved to FC Porto in a similar circumstance in July 2016, where he signed his first professional contract of four years in 2017.

On 26 November 2017, Reabciuk made his professional debut for FC Porto B in LigaPro, at home to Associação Académica de Coimbra. He played the first 67 minutes of the 2–1 defeat before being substituted for Musa Yahaya. The following 4 February, he scored a late winner as the team came from behind to beat neighbouring Leixões S.C. 2–1 also at the Estádio Dr. Jorge Sampaio. By 18 March, when he netted his fourth goal in ten appearances with one in a 3–0 home win over S.C. Covilhã, he was the team's top scorer for the season.

Paços de Ferreira
On 13 July 2019, Reabciuk signed a four-year deal with F.C. Paços de Ferreira. He made his Primeira Liga debut on 24 August in a 1–1 draw at Boavista F.C. as a 75th-minute substitute for Renat Dadashov. On 18 October 2020, he scored his first top-flight goal to open a 2–1 home win over C.D. Santa Clara, his team's first of the season.

Olympiacos
On 1 January 2021, Reabciuk completed a €2 million transfer to Superleague Greece outfit Olympiacos, signing a long-term deal until the summer of 2025. He made his debut five days later in a 4–0 win at Asteras Tripolis F.C. as an 85th-minute substitute for José Holebas, and ended the season as a league champion. 

On 16 September 2021, Reabciuk scored his first goal for the club in a 2–1 UEFA Europa League home win over Royal Antwerp F.C. in the 87th minute. His first league goal came the following 4 May to win 2–1 away to PAOK FC to lift the title.

International career
In November 2016, Reabciuk was called up for the Moldova national under-19 football team. At that time, he did not have proficiency in the Romanian language, nor did he possess a Moldovan passport.

Reabciuk was called up by Moldova national football team manager Alexandru Spiridon in March 2018, for a friendly against the Ivory Coast, while having just ten senior appearances for Porto B to his name. On 27 March, he played 65 minutes in that match, a 1–2 defeat in Beauvais, France, before being replaced. He was Moldovan Footballer of the Year for three consecutive years, 2020, 2021 and 2022.

Career statistics

Club

International

Honours
Olympiacos 
Super League Greece: 2020–21, 2021–22
Greek Cup runner-up: 2020–21

Individual
Moldovan Footballer of the Year: 2020, 2021, 2022

References

External links

1998 births
Living people
People from Ialoveni District
People from Rio Maior
Moldovan footballers
Moldova international footballers
Association football fullbacks
FC Porto B players
F.C. Paços de Ferreira players
Olympiacos F.C. players
Primeira Liga players
Liga Portugal 2 players
Super League Greece players
Moldovan emigrants to Portugal
Portuguese people of Moldovan descent
Moldovan expatriate footballers
Expatriate footballers in Portugal
Moldovan expatriate sportspeople in Portugal
Expatriate footballers in Greece
Moldovan expatriate sportspeople in Greece
Moldova youth international footballers